Sayella fusca, common name the brown sayella,  is a species of minute sea snail, a marine gastropod mollusk or micromollusk in the family Pyramidellidae, the pyrams and their allies.

Description
The length of the shell varies between 3 mm and 6 mm.

Distribution
This species occurs in the following locations:
 Caribbean Sea : Cuba, Puerto Rico
 Gulf of Mexico : Mexico
 Northwest Atlantic : Prince Edward Island, Canada; Gulf of Maine

Notes
Additional information regarding this species:
 Distribution: Range: 47°N to 18°N; 93.13°W to 64°W. Distribution: Canada; Canada: Prince Edward Island, New Brunswick; USA: Massachusetts, Rhode Island, Connecticut, New York, New Jersey, North Carolina, Florida; Florida: West Florida; Mexico; Mexico: Tabasco, Yucatán State, Quintana Roo
 Habitat: intertidal and infralittoral of the Gulf and estuary

References

 Bisby, F.A., M.A. Ruggiero, K.L. Wilson, M. Cachuela-Palacio, S.W. Kimani, Y.R. Roskov, A. Soulier-Perkins and J. van Hertum 2005 Species 2000 & ITIS Catalogue of Life: 2005 Annual Checklist. CD-ROM; Species 2000: Reading, U.K.

External links
 To Encyclopedia of Life
 To USNM Invertebrate Zoology Mollusca Collection
 To ITIS
 To World Register of Marine Species

Pyramidellidae
Gastropods described in 1839